Donald Alexander MacRae ( – ) was a Canadian astronomer.

Born in Halifax, Nova Scotia he was the Chair of the Department of Astronomy (now Astronomy and Astrophysics) at the University of Toronto and Director of the David Dunlap Observatory from 1965 to 1978.  He was one of a few Canadians who were early Ph.D. graduates in Astronomy from Harvard (1943), where he enrolled after graduating from the University of Toronto in 1937.  He appeared in the Academy Award-nominated NFB documentary Universe (1960) as the astronomer. He introduced radio astronomy to Toronto, constructing a radio telescope.  It was small and so worked at higher frequencies than previous radio telescopes.  He saw a strong signal, but failed to publish. He died December 6, 2006.

External links
 The Journal of the Royal Astronomical Society of Canada, December 1999 
 A Memorial Tribute in Cassiopeia, December 2006 in PDF or in HTML.
Guide to the Donald Alexander MacRae Papers 1943-1946 at the University of Chicago Special Collections Research Center

1916 births
20th-century Canadian astronomers
Canadian people of Scottish descent
Fellows of the Royal Society of Canada
People from Halifax, Nova Scotia
Harvard Graduate School of Arts and Sciences alumni
University of Toronto alumni
Academic staff of the University of Toronto
2006 deaths